Cymothoe ochreata is a butterfly in the family Nymphalidae. It is found in the eastern part of the Democratic Republic of the Congo and western Uganda.

References

Butterflies described in 1890
Cymothoe (butterfly)
Butterflies of Africa